Dąbie  is a village in the administrative district of Gmina Radomyśl Wielki, within Mielec County, Podkarpackie Voivodeship, in south-eastern Poland.
The village has a population of approximately 980 and lies on the junction of the Tuszymka and Wisłoka rivers.

References

Villages in Mielec County